Edwin Otoniel Carranza Solís (born 22 December 1983) is a Salvadoran professional football player.

Club career

Águila 
Carranza began his career through the Águila youth system and was a prominent young defender whose organization and determination gained wide admiration.

During his early career, he has won three national league titles with Águila (Apertura 2000, Clausura 2001 and Clausura 2006), and won a gold medal with El Salvador national team during the football matches of the 2002 Central American and Caribbean Games.

After winning the championship in 2006 he was called for play with the El Salvador national team, but he did not accept.

He had a chance to be in the national team again in 2008, but he had a minor abdominal pain that prevented him.

Atlético Balboa 
In 2009 he signed for Atlético Balboa, but left them later in that year after not being paid by the club of La Unión.

ADI 
In 2010 Carranza signed with ADI of Intipucá, team that at that time played in the Segunda División.

Juventud Independiente 
In 2012 Carranza signed with Juventud Independiente. With the team of San Juan Opico, Carranza had a good season in the Primera División.

UES 
In 2013, he signed with UES. With the scarlet team Carranza had very important moments, by example he scored two goals in a game against Juventud Independiente that ended in victory for the UES (3–2) in the Estado Universitario and he became team captain. However, during those years, the UES team was in a terrible administrative situation, suffered arrears in salary payments and Carranza was losing presence in the matches, until he finally left the team in 2016.

Aspirante 
After leaving the UES, Carranza had a very short step with Aspirante.

Dragón 
Carranza signed with Dragón for the Clausura 2017 tournament. The team of San Miguel also suffered many administrative, economic and sports problems. Carranza ended up leaving the team months later.

International career
Carranza made his debut for El Salvador in an April 2004 friendly match against Colombia and has earned a total of 3 caps, scoring no goals. He has represented his country in only 1 FIFA World Cup qualification match.

His final international game was an August 2004 friendly match against Honduras.

References

External links

1983 births
Living people
People from La Unión Department
Association football defenders
Salvadoran footballers
El Salvador international footballers
C.D. Águila footballers
Atlético Balboa footballers